George Vincent Thomas  (25 June 1930 – February 2014) was a Welsh professional footballer. A wing half, he played for Cardiff City before joining Newport County in 1953, and went on to make 137 appearances in the Football League for the club between then and 1959.

References

1930 births
2014 deaths
Footballers from Cardiff
Association football wing halves
Welsh footballers
Cardiff City F.C. players
Newport County A.F.C. players
Bath City F.C. players
English Football League players